The 143rd Massachusetts General Court, consisting of the Massachusetts Senate and the Massachusetts House of Representatives, met in 1923 and 1924 during the governorship of Channing H. Cox. Frank G. Allen served as president of the Senate and Benjamin Loring Young served as speaker of the House.

Senators

Representatives

See also
 1924 Massachusetts gubernatorial election
 68th United States Congress
 List of Massachusetts General Courts

References

Further reading

External links

 
 
 
 

Political history of Massachusetts
Massachusetts legislative sessions
massachusetts
1923 in Massachusetts
massachusetts
1924 in Massachusetts